The 1971 Campeonato Brasileiro Série A (officially the Primeiro Campeonato Nacional de Clubes, "First National Championship of Clubs")  was the first official Brazilian football championship, and 15th edition overall of the Série A following the Taça Brasil  and Torneio Roberto Gomes Pedrosa tournaments (which have been considered by the Brazilian confederation as valid national tournaments since 2010). Organized by the Brazilian Confederation of Sports (CBD), it was won by Atlético Mineiro.

While the tournament represented the top tier of Brazilian football, its name was "Division Extra", with "First Division" instead used by the second-tier tournament (since known as Campeonato Brasileiro Série B).

Background
During the 1960s, two tournaments were used to pick Brazil's representative at the Copa Libertadores:  Taça Brasil  (1959-1968), a single-elimination tournament between the state champions; and Torneio Roberto Gomes Pedrosa (1967-1970), divided in two separate group phases with teams mostly from the states of Rio de Janeiro and São Paulo. Both tournaments had a format that barely covered the entire country and had regional phases that diminished fan support, leading to dissatisfaction from both the team owners and the Brazilian Confederation of Sports (CBD), who organized the championship. In 1970, the Brazil national football team won the  1970 FIFA World Cup in Mexico, becoming the first three-time world champion. Seeing the valorization of Brazilian football, president Emílio Médici and the Brazilian media pushed CBD towards a true national tournament. With a format inspired by the European tournaments, the tournament would feature 20 teams. The format of the national tournament was still close to the 1970 Torneio Roberto Gomes Pedrosa, with the state of Ceará being the only addition to the seven featured in the Robertão's final edition.
Some of the shunned federation states, led by Goiás, even created their own parallel national tournament, the Torneio Integração da CBD.

Competition format
The season was divided into three phases:

The First Phase saw the twenty teams divided into two groups of ten. Despite being divided into groups, the phase was contested in a single round-robin format, with each team playing the others once. The top six teams in each group advanced to the Second Phase.
The Second Phase saw the twelve qualified teams divided into three groups of four. The teams within each group played each other in a double round-robin format. The top team from each group advanced to the Final Phase.
 The Final Phase saw the three team play each other team once. The team with the most points at the end of the round was declared the champion.

Teams
Twenty clubs participated in this championship (home city in parenthesis):

America-RJ (Rio de Janeiro)
América-MG (Belo Horizonte)
Atlético Mineiro (Belo Horizonte)
Bahia (Salvador) 
Botafogo (Rio de Janeiro)
Ceará (Fortaleza) 
Corinthians (São Paulo) 
Coritiba (Curitiba) 
Cruzeiro (Belo Horizonte)
Flamengo (Rio de Janeiro)
Fluminense (Rio de Janeiro)
Grêmio (Porto Alegre)
Internacional (Porto Alegre)
Palmeiras (São Paulo)
Portuguesa (São Paulo)
Santa Cruz (Recife)
Santos (Santos)
São Paulo (São Paulo)
Sport (Recife)
Vasco da Gama (Rio de Janeiro)

First phase

Group A standings

Group B standings

Second phase

Group A

Group B

Group C

Final phase

Final standings

References

Sources

 1971 Campeonato Brasileiro Série A at RSSSF

1971
1
Bra
B